Aidos perfusa is a moth of the Aididae family. It is found from Central America to French Guiana.

Subspecies
Aidos perfusa perfusa
Aidos perfusa admiranda Schaus, 1912 (Costa Rica)

References

Moths described in 1905
Zygaenoidea